Pattonomys is a genus of rodent in the family Echimyidae, named after American mammalogist James L. Patton.
It contains the following species:
 Bare-tailed armored tree-rat (Pattonomys occasius)
 Speckled spiny tree-rat (Pattonomys semivillosus)

Phylogeny
Pattonomys is the sister genus to Toromys. These taxa are closely related to Echimys, Phyllomys, and Makalata, reflecting the fact that Pattonomys occasius and Toromys grandis have formerly been placed in Makalata by some authorities. In turn, these five genera share phylogenetic affinities with a clade containing the bamboo rats Dactylomys, Olallamys, Kannabateomys together with Diplomys and Santamartamys.

References

 
Echimyidae
Rodent genera
Mammals described in 2005
Taxa named by Louise H. Emmons